Michael Jackson (November 11, 1949), better known by his ring name Mike Jackson is an American professional wrestler who currently works for Impact Wrestling and the independent circuit in Georgia and Alabama. During the 1970s and 1980s he worked for Georgia Championship Wrestling and a short time with World Championship Wrestling in the 1980s and early 1990s.

Professional wrestling career
Jackson made his professional wrestling debut in June 1972. Early in his career he worked for NWA Mid-America and Southeast Championship Wrestling. In 1978 he made his debut for Georgia Championship Wrestling.

During his career he wrestled against Ric Flair, Carlos Colon and Bob Backlund. He also worked for American Wrestling Association, UWF Mid-South, World Wrestling Federation and Jim Crockett Promotions (which later became World Championship Wrestling) from 1984 to 1991.

He went into semi-retirement from wrestling in the early 1990s and made his last appearance in the 1993 Pro Wrestling Illustrated's Top 500 at 382.

In 1998, he wrestled for New Dimension Wrestling and then once again retired.

Then in 2005 he came out of retirement working for NWA Wrestle Birmingham and Peachstate Wrestling Alliance in Georgia.

On December 8, 2019, Jackson and Tommy Rich defeated 1 Called Manders and Mance Warner to win the WOMBAT tag team titles.

As of 2022, Jackson still wrestles in Georgia and Alabama.

Impact Wrestling (2020, 2021-present) 
On March 7, 2020, Jackson made his debut for Impact Wrestling at 70 years old losing to Johnny Swinger on a TV-taping which aired April 14.

Jackson returned to Impact for one night only on December 18, 2021, teaming with Johnny Swinger as The Rhythmic Warriors as they defeated Kar Daniel Dunn and Chris Sabin. Jackson then participated in the Reverse Battle Royal at Slammiversary (2022) won by Shark Boy. 

He wrestled in a 6-way scramble won by KUSHIDA at Hard To Kill (2023). The next night he lost to Trey Miguel.

Championships and accomplishments
Georgia Pro Wrestling Association
GPWA Southern Cruiserweight Championship 

Game Changer Wrestling
WOMBAT Tag Team Championship (1 time) - with Tommy Rich

Peachstate Wrestling Alliance
PWA Heritage Championship (3 times)

Pro Wrestling Illustrated
PWI ranked Mike Jackson # 346 of the 500 best singles wrestlers of the PWI 500 in 1991
PWI ranked Mike Jackson # 277 of the 500 best singles wrestlers of the PWI 500 in 1992
PWI ranked Mike Jackson # 382 of the 500 best singles wrestlers of the PWI 500 in 1993
PWI ranked Mike Jackson # 480 of the 500 best singles wrestlers of the PWI 500 in 2022

Southern Championship Wrestling
SCW Alabama Junior Heavyweight Championship (3 times)

References

External links
Mike Jackson at OWW.com
Mike Jackson at Cagematch.net
Mike Jackson at Wrestlingdata.com

American male professional wrestlers
Professional wrestlers from Alabama
1949 births
Living people
People from Birmingham, Alabama
20th-century professional wrestlers
21st-century professional wrestlers